Long Vacations of 36 is a 1976 Spanish drama film directed by Jaime Camino dealing with the effects of Spanish Civil War on a bourgeois family trapped by the conflict in a tourist village near Barcelona.

The film won  three awards at the 26th Berlin International Film Festival: FIPRESCI Prize, Interfilm Award - Recommendation, and UNICRIT Award - Honorable Mention.

The original ending (Franco's cavalry entry in the village, intentionally showed as a blurred image) was cut by Spanish censorship of that time. The film ends with all the Republicans marching to exile, and the fascist couple waiting at home.

Plot
In the summer of 1936, the beginning of the Spanish Civil War, a bourgeois family with many children, spending their holiday near Barcelona, tries to remain neutral between the Republicans and the supporters of General Francisco Franco. But the war change the lives of all.

Cast
Analía Gadé as Virginia
Ismael Merlo as El Abuelo
Ángela Molina as Encarna
Vicente Parra as Paco
Francisco Rabal as El Maestro
José Sacristán as Jorge
Charo Soriano as Rosita
Concha Velasco as Mercedes
José Vivó as Alberto

References

External links
 

Spanish drama films
1976 films
1970s Spanish-language films
1976 drama films
Spanish Civil War films
Films set in Barcelona
Films directed by Jaime Camino
Films set in the 1930s
1970s Spanish films